Ofer Gabber (עופר גאבר; born May 16, 1958) is a mathematician working in algebraic geometry.

Life 
In 1978 Gabber received a Ph.D. from Harvard University for the thesis Some theorems on Azumaya algebras, written under the supervision of Barry Mazur. Gabber has been at the Institut des Hautes Études Scientifiques in Bures-sur-Yvette in Paris since 1984 as a 
CNRS senior researcher. He won the Erdős Prize in 1981 and the Prix Thérèse Gautier from the French Academy of Sciences in 2011. In 1981 Gabber with Victor Kac published a proof of a conjecture stated by Kac in 1968.

Books 
 With Lorenzo Ramero: Almost Ring Theory, Springer, Lecture Notes in Computer Science, vol 1800, 2003.
 With Brian Conrad, Gopal Prasad: Pseudo-reductive Groups, Cambridge University Press, 2010; 2015, 2nd edition

See also 
almost ring theory
Theorem of absolute purity

References

Israeli mathematicians
Algebraic geometers
Living people
1958 births
Harvard University alumni
Erdős Prize recipients